The Puntland Security Force (PSF) is based in the autonomous Puntland region in northeastern Somalia. Among PSF’s main functions are conducting crime scene analysis, capturing and eliminating high-level targets, and reconnaissance. PSF was formed solely to combat terrorism in the region and is independent from the Somali Federal government and the Puntland government.

In 2002, amid concerns that al Qaeda elements were operating in East Africa, PIS (current day PSF & PIA) was established as a cooperation between the CIA and Puntland leadership.

In 2003, Mohamed Aden Bidar was appointed as the first PIS Director. Bidar then resigned and moved to Mogadishu where he became the first Commander of the Somali National Security Services (NSS) 

In 2004, Osman Abdullahi Mohamoud was appointed as the Puntland Intelligence Security (PIS) Director. 

In 2009, President Faroole elected Colonel Ali Bindhe as a PIS Director without the consultation of U.S officials in Somalia. The officials rejected the appointment due to Bindhe’s lack of security experience. President Faroole & US officials agreed to divide the PIS into two divisions - PSF as counter-terrorism special forces & Puntland Intelligence Agency as Intelligence Agency (PIA). Two agencies were formed - the PIA, which was led by Director, Mohamed Jama (MJ), and PSF, which was led by Director General, Osman Abdullahi Mohamud.

After the passing of Director General Osman Abdullahi Mohamud, Asad Osman Abdullahi was appointed the new PSF Director in 2010.

In 2018 December, Asad Osman Abdullahi resigned as the PSF General Director. After consultation with U.S officials, Mohamud Osman Abdullahi was appointed as General Director.

As of December 2021, the PSF has approximately 600 armed and trained members.

History
Following the outbreak of the civil war in 1991, a homegrown constitutional conference was held in Garowe in 1998 over a period of three months. Attended by the area's political elite, traditional elders (Issims), members of the business community, intellectuals and other civil society representatives, the autonomous Puntland State of Somalia was subsequently officially established so as to deliver services to the population, offer security, facilitate trade, and interact with both domestic and international partners. The PSF was subsequently formed by the regional government.

Since the founding of the state in 1998, the Force has operated in Puntland and throughout Somalia. Commanders and senior officials of the military are appointed by a qualified panel approved by the Council of Ministers.

The Puntland security apparatus has an independent military judiciary, which during peacetime only adjudges military proceedings. Retired members of the Force are also constitutionally guaranteed pensions.

Puntland Dervish Force

The Puntland Dervish Force is separate from the PSF and operates officially as the National Guard of Puntland's Armed Forces.

Equipment
 Individual Weapons
 Assault Rifle
AKM (Assault Rifle - 7.62×39mm)
AK-74 (Assault Rifle - 5.45×39mm)
PK machine gun (General-purpose machine gun - 7.62×54mmR)
 Sniper Rifle
SVD Dragunov (Sniper Rifle - 7.62×54mmR)
 Anti-Tank Explosive
RPG-7 (rocket-propelled grenade launcher - 40 mm)
 Vehicles
 Main Battle Tank
T-54/T-55
 Armoured Personnel Carrier
BTR-60
Fiat 6614
 Military trucks
Renault GBC 180 (6×6)
M939 Truck (6×6)
 Pickup trucks
Toyota Land Cruiser J79
Toyota Hilux
Nissan Frontier
Armored Ford F350 Gun Truck
 Artillery and heavy machine guns
 Heavy machine guns
 12.7mm DShK
 12.7mm NSV
 Self-Propelled Artillery
 122mm BM-21 Grad Multiple Rocket Launcher
 Mortar
 60mm M-224
 Anti-Aircraft Gun
 ZU-23-2

Puntland Police Force
The Puntland security apparatus also operates its own Police Force. The latter includes a Special Protection Unit.

Puntland Intelligence Agency

The Puntland Intelligence Agency is the intelligence bureau of Puntland's military. It was officially established in 2001 as the Puntland Intelligence Service during the rule of President Abdullahi Yusuf Ahmed, with help from the United States.
The agency principally operates in the Puntland region, where it serves as the main intelligence and counter-terrorism wing of the government's security forces.

Puntland Maritime Police Force

The Puntland Maritime Police Force is a locally recruited, professional maritime security force. It is primarily aimed at preventing, detecting and eradicating piracy, illegal fishing, and other illicit activity off of the coast of Somalia, in addition to generally safeguarding the nation's marine resources.

In addition, the Force provides logistics support to humanitarian efforts, such as repairing wells; delivering relief supplies, medical supplies, food, and water; rehabilitating hospitals and clinics; and refurbishing roads, airports, and other infrastructure. It also offers skills training programs to local communities.

As of March 2012, the PMPF has around 500 troops. The Force is eventually expected to comprise 1,000 soldiers.

Agreements
In January 2015, President of Puntland Abdiweli Mohamed Ali signed a bilateral agreement with the EU head of Civilian Operations Commander for all Civilian Common Security Defence Policy (CSDP) Missions Kenneth Dean, which stipulates that a new EUCAP Nestor base will be established in Garowe. The European Union's Maritime Capacity Building Mission in the Horn of Africa and Western Indian Ocean (EUCAP Nestor) is mandated to assist nations in the latter regions to strengthen their maritime defense capabilities. As such, the new base aims to advance cooperation, to train Puntland forces in maritime security and anti-terrorism, particularly vis-a-vis ground operations, and to develop and firm up on extant maritime security instruments and legislation.

See also
Military of Somalia
Somali Salvation Democratic Front

References

Organisations based in Puntland
Military of Somalia
1998 establishments in Somalia
Organizations established in 1998
Law enforcement in Somalia